Bolshaya Rechka is a rural locality (a selo) in Kabansky District, Republic of Buryatia, Russia. The population was 494 as of 2010. There are 4 streets.

Geography 
Bolshaya Rechka is located 31 km southwest of Kabansk (the district's administrative centre) by road. Posolskaya is the nearest rural locality.

References 

Rural localities in Kabansky District